John Boys may refer to:

Politicians
John Boys (fl. 1388), MP for Plympton Erle (UK Parliament constituency)
John Boys (died 1447), MP for Middlesex (UK Parliament constituency) and Hampshire
John Boys (died 1612), MP for Canterbury, Sandwich and Midhurst
John Boys (died 1533), MP for Sandwich (UK Parliament constituency)
John Boys (Parliamentarian) (c. 1607–1678), MP for Kent

Religion
John Boys (priest) (1571–1625), Dean of Canterbury, 1619–1625
John Boys (bishop) (1897–1965), Bishop of Kimberley and Kuruman, 1951–1960

Translators
John Bois (1560–1643), also spelt John Boys, English translator
John Boys (classicist) (1614?–1661), English translator of Virgil

Others
John Boys (Royalist) (1607–1664), military commander
John Boys (agriculturalist) (1749–1824), agriculturist
John Boys (cricketer) (1856–1883), English cricketer

See also
John Boyes (disambiguation)
John Boy and Billy